Juan Antonio García Bayona (born 9 May 1975) is a Spanish film director.

He directed the 2007 horror film The Orphanage, the 2012 drama film The Impossible, and the 2016 fantasy drama film A Monster Calls. Bayona's latest film is the 2018 science fiction adventure film Jurassic World: Fallen Kingdom, the fifth installment of the Jurassic Park film series. He has also directed television commercials and music videos. He directed the first two episodes of The Lord of the Rings: The Rings of Power.

Early life
Bayona was born in Barcelona, Spain. The first movie he ever watched was Richard Donner's Superman (1978) which inspired him to be a director. He studied at the Escola Superior de Cinema i Audiovisuals de Catalunya (ESCAC). At age 19 he met Guillermo del Toro at the Sitges Film Festival presenting Cronos (1993) and Bayona recognized him as a mentor there. After their initial conversations, del Toro promised to aid Bayona in the future if he were ever in the position to do so.

Career

1990s
After graduating from ESCAC he began his career directing commercials and music videos. At the age of 20, he signed his first contract as audiovisual producer for the Spanish band OBK. After three years working with them, he was awarded the Premios Ondas for the music video "Tú sigue así". Since then, he has become the principal director of the group Camela and was commissioned to illustrate the piece "Cómo repartimos los amigos", in which the duo Ella Baila Sola bid farewell to their audience.

He has also directed music videos for Pastora Soler ("En mi soledad"), Fangoria, Nena Daconte ("El Aleph"), Enrique Bunbury and Miren Iza ("Frente a frente"), in which the original singer Jeanette appears at the end of the video. In 2012 he created the music video for "Disconnected" by the British band Keane.

In 1999 he directed the short film My Holidays and in 2002 The Spongeman.

2000s

In 2004 Bayona met writer Sergio G. Sánchez, who was working on the short 7337. Sánchez offered Bayona the script for The Orphanage. In order to create the film he wanted, Bayona had to double both the film's budget and its runtime. He was assisted by Guillermo del Toro, who offered to co-produce it. The Orphanage premiered on 20 May 2007, at the Cannes International Film Festival, where it received a standing ovation lasting more than ten minutes. Months later, on 11 October 2007, it premiered in Spanish cinemas and grossed $8.3 million.

Bayona was awarded the Goya Award for Best New Director in 2008. The film was nominated for 14 categories of Goyas, and won 7. In October of that same year, Variety announced that Universal Studios had signed a contract with Bayona to adapt the film Hater by David Moody, written by Glen Mazzara and produced by Guillermo del Toro.

Bayona was one of the many candidates considered to direct The Twilight Saga: Eclipse but was not interested in making the film.

2010s
In August 2010 he began filming The Impossible, based on the experiences of a Spanish family that lived through the 2004 Indian Ocean earthquake. Filmed in English and starring Ewan McGregor and Naomi Watts, the film was released on 11 October 2012, to positive critical response. In its first weekend it grossed $8.6 million, breaking the record for the best opening in the history of the Spanish box office. The Impossible was nominated for the Oscar and Golden Globe Awards in the category of Best Actress for the interpretation of Naomi Watts. The film was also nominated in 14 categories at the Goya Awards, including Best Film, Best Director, Best Actress, Best Supporting Actor and Best Actor (Tom Holland), of which it won five awards. In 2013 The Impossible received a National Film Award in the framework of the 61st International Festival of San Sebastián.

In March 2012 Bayona directed the music video "Disconnected", the second single from the album Strangeland by the British band Keane. The band has stated that it admires Bayona's film work, and Bayona has said he follows the music of Keane. On 11 September 2016, Keane released a music video for an exclusive new song, "Tear Up This Town", written and recorded for the fantasy drama film A Monster Calls, directed by Bayona. The single was made available for digital download on 23 September 2016.

Bayona was responsible for directing the first two episodes of the Penny Dreadful series, created by John Logan and originally released on Showtime. Filmed in Dublin, the series tells the story of a group consisting of a rich man, a medium, a gunman and a young doctor, all looking for the rich man's missing daughter. To do this, they must cope with strange beings and Victorian era literary characters like Frankenstein, Dracula and Dorian Gray. The series has a lot of its creator, according to Bayona.

In 2014, Bayona began shooting the film A Monster Calls, an adaptation of the novel by Patrick Ness, starring Lewis MacDougall, Felicity Jones, and Liam Neeson. The film, which was released in 2016, tells the story of a young boy (MacDougall) who cares for his mother (Jones), ill with cancer, while befriending a monster (Neeson). With this film, Bayona closed his personal trilogy about mother-child relationships.

In 2018, Bayona next directed the science fiction sequel Jurassic World: Fallen Kingdom. The film received mixed reviews from critics but Bayona's direction received praise. It was also a major commercial success, becoming the third-highest-grossing film of 2018 and the 12th-highest-grossing film of all time.

Bayona directed the first two episodes of the Amazon Prime Video series The Lord of the Rings: The Rings of Power, filmed in New Zealand from 3 February 2020 and premiered on 2 September 2022.

Future projects
Back in October 2008, Variety announced that Universal Studios had signed Bayona to direct Hater, an adaptation of British author David Moody's thriller novel about an epidemic of violence caused by regular people. The film will be written by Glen Mazzara and produced by Guillermo del Toro and Mark Johnson.

In November 2021, it was announced Bayona would direct the disaster drama Society of the Snow for Netflix, based on the true story of Uruguayan Air Force Flight 571, which crashed into the Andes in October 1972.

In November 2022, at the Seville European Film Festival, Bayona announced that he was working together with Agustín Díaz Yanes in the adaptation of Manuel Chaves Nogales' book A sangre y fuego.

Filmography

Short films

Feature films
Director
 The Orphanage (2007)
 The Impossible (2012)
 A Monster Calls (2016)
 Jurassic World: Fallen Kingdom (2018)
 Society of the Snow (2023) (Also writer)

Executive producer
 Marrowbone (2017)
 I Hate New York (2018) (Documentary)

Television

Awards and nominations

References

External links

1975 births
Living people
Horror film directors
Best Director Goya Award winners
Film directors from Catalonia
People from Barcelona